The non-marine molluscs of Cook Islands are a part of the molluscan fauna of the Cook Islands. There are 14 species of land snails listed as extinct in 2009 IUCN Red List, and 48 species of land gastropods.

Gastropoda

Freshwater gastropods

Land gastropods 

Assimineidae
 Atropis rarotongana Brook, 2010 - endemic

Endodontidae
 Minidonta aroa Brook, 2010 - endemic
 Minidonta arorangi Brook, 2010 - endemic
 Minidonta iota Brook, 2010 - endemic
 Minidonta kavera Brook, 2010 - endemic
 Minidonta matavera Brook, 2010 - endemic
 Minidonta ngatangiia Brook, 2010 - endemic
 Minidonta pue Brook, 2010 - endemic
 Minidonta rutaki Brook, 2010 - endemic
 Thaumatodon multilamellata Garrett, 1887 - extinct

Charopidae
 Libera fratercula fratercula (Pease)
 Libera subcavernula Tryon, 1887 - extinct
 Libera tumuloides Garrett, 1872 - extinct
 Mautodontha unilamellata Garrett, 1884 - extinct
 Mautodontha zebrina - extinct
 Sinployea atiensis
 Sinployea andrewi
 Sinployea avanaensis
 Sinployea canalis Garrett, 1872 - extinct
 Sinployea decorticata (Garrett, 1872) - extinct
 Sinployea harveyensis Garrett, 1872 - extinct
 Sinployea muri Brook, 2010 - endemic
 Sinployea otareae Garrett, 1872 - extinct
 Sinployea planospira Garrett, 1872 - extinct
 Sinployea proxima Garrett, 1872 - extinct
 Sinployea rudis Garrett, 1872 - extinct
 Sinployea taipara Brook, 2010 - endemic
 Sinployea tenuicostata Garrett, 1872 - extinct
 Sinployea titikaveka Brook, 2010 - endemic
 Sinployea tupapa Brook, 2010 - endemic
 Sinployea youngi Garrett, 1872 - extinct

Vertiginidae
 Nesopupa rarotonga Brook, 2010 - endemic

Freshwater bivalves
The status of freshwater bivalves in this area is currently unknown.

See also
 List of non-marine molluscs of American Samoa
 List of non-marine molluscs of New Zealand

References

Molluscs
Molluscs
Cook
Cook Islands
Cook